New Mexico State Road 52 (NM 52) is an approximately 88.6 mi (142.6 km) long state highway in Socorro County in the state of New Mexico. It runs approximately north–south. Its northern terminus is near the Very Large Array at U.S. Route 60 (US 60) between the towns of Magdalena to the east and Datil to the west. For much of its length, it is running west of the two southern sections of the Magdalena District of Cibola National Forest, as well as running east of Gila National Forest. For approximately 30 miles or so nearest to its southern terminus, it runs east from Winston, NM. Its southern terminus is in Truth or Consequences at NM 181. For the two miles nearest to the southern terminus, the road is also designated NM 181 (near the Truth or Consequences Municipal Airport). It is a paved 2 lane road north to the NM 59 junction and is graded dirt road for approximately 40–45 miles from near the junction of NM 59 to the VLA.

Major intersections

See also

References

External links

052
Transportation in Socorro County, New Mexico